The Choralis Constantinus is a collection of over 375 Gregorian chant-based polyphonic motets for the proper of the mass composed by Heinrich Isaac and his pupil Ludwig Senfl. The genesis of the collection is a commission by the Constance Cathedral for Isaac, at that time the official court composer for the Holy Roman Emperor Maximilian I, to compose a set of motets for the special holy days celebrated in the diocese of Constance. Isaac was in Constance at the time (April 1508) with the Imperial court as Maximilian had called a meeting of the German nobility (Reichstag) there. The music was delivered to the Constance Cathedral in late 1508 and early 1509.

After Isaac's death in 1517 his pupil Ludwig Senfl, who had been a member of the Imperial chapel choir, compiled music composed for Constance and for the Habsburg Imperial court into the collection which was published by Hieronymus Formschneider in Nuremberg in three volumes (1550–1555) and titled the Choralis Constantinus.  Gerhard Pätzig, in his dissertation for the University of Tübingen in 1956, compared available manuscripts with the Formschneider print and determined that the music written for the Constance Cathedral was most of that contained in Volume II and parts of Volume III of the Formschneider publication. The remainder of the Choralis Constantinus is from Maximilian's court repertory.

A modern edition appeared in Volumes 10 and 32 of Denkmäler der Tonkunst in Österreich, the latter edited by Anton Webern, the famous composer, who was a composition student of Arnold Schoenberg. He prepared this volume as part of his dissertation for the University of Vienna, where he received his PhD in 1906.  Volume III, edited by Louise Cuyler, was published by the University of Michigan Press in 1950. The Formschneider edition was reprinted with short introductory essays by Edward R. Lerner (Peer: Alamire, 1990–1994).

Each Feast contains a polyphonic motet, based on the corresponding Gregorian chant for the Introit, Alleluia (or Tract) and Communion. Volume II contains most of the Solemn Feasts. Those Propers all include alternate verses of the Sequence hymn, set thus so as to allow for alternatim performance between the choir and the organist.  The medieval Sequence was of particular interest to the Constance diocese, which included the monasteries of Reichenau and St. Gall where many Sequences originated.

Choralis Constantinus I (Denkmäler der Tonkunst in Österreich, Volume 10):

Choralis Constantinus II (Denkmäler der Tonkunst in Österreich, Volume 32):

Choralis Constantinus III (University of Michigan Press, 1950)

Recordings
Margaretha-Maximilian I, Capilla Flamenca together with La Caccia, Schola Cantorum Cantate Domino, Schola Gregoriana Lovaniensis and Joris Verdin, 2001 (Orf CD 265). Contains proper chants from the Choralis Constantinus along with several pieces of secular music.

Further reading

External links
score of part I (Denkmäler der Tonkunst in Österreich, Band 10) at the International Music Score Library Project 
Modern editions of many items at the Choral Public Domain Library

Renaissance music
Masses (music)
Motets